Alan Maple (12 April 1917 – 28 May 2006) was a former Australian rules footballer who played for the Richmond Football Club in the Victorian Football League (VFL).

Notes

External links 
		

1917 births
2006 deaths
Australian rules footballers from Victoria (Australia)
Richmond Football Club players